The Philippine House Special Committee on West Philippine Sea is a special committee of the Philippine House of Representatives.

Jurisdiction 
As prescribed by House Rules, the committee's jurisdiction is on the South China Sea issues which includes the following:
 Joint cooperation arrangements
 Maritime and environmental concerns
 National and regional peace and security issues
 Territorial and boundary disputes

The committee is named after "West Philippine Sea", a designation by the Philippine government on portions of the South China Sea.

Members, 18th Congress

See also 
 House of Representatives of the Philippines
 List of Philippine House of Representatives committees
 Territorial disputes in the South China Sea

References

External links 
House of Representatives of the Philippines

West Philippine Sea
Territorial disputes of the Philippines
South China Sea